Italy is set to participate in the Eurovision Song Contest 2023 in Liverpool, United Kingdom. Italian broadcaster RAI announced in June 2022 that the winning performer(s) of the Sanremo Music Festival 2023, later revealed to be Marco Mengoni with "", would earn the right to represent the nation at the contest.

Background 

Prior to the 2023 contest, Italy has participated in the Eurovision Song Contest forty-six times since its first entry at the inaugural contest in 1956. Italy has withdrawn from the Eurovision Song Contest a number of times, with their most recent absence spanning from 1998 until 2010. A number of top 10 placements followed in the next editions, culminating with their victory in 2021. As hosts in 2022, Italy placed sixth with "Brividi" by Mahmood and Blanco.

Between 2011 and 2013 and since 2015, the Sanremo Music Festival has regularly been used to select the Italian entrant to the contest, at first through an intermediate stage of internal selection among the contestants, and after 2014 (when a full internal selection took place), the winner of the festival has always earned the right of first refusal to represent Italy in the Eurovision Song Contest.

Before Eurovision

Artist selection 

Italian broadcaster RAI confirmed that the performer that would represent Italy at the Eurovision Song Contest 2023 would be selected from the competing artists at the Sanremo Music Festival 2023, the 73rd edition of the event. According to the rules of Sanremo 2023, the winner of the festival will earn the right to represent Italy at the Eurovision Song Contest, but in case the artist is not available or refuses the offer, the organisers of the event reserve the right to choose another participant via their own criteria. The competition took place between 7 and 11 February 2023, with the winner being selected on the last day of the festival.

For the fourth year in a row, Amadeus served as the artistic director and presenter of Sanremo, alongside  participant Gianni Morandi, and was joined on stage by Chiara Ferragni, Paola Egonu and Chiara Francini, each on a different night. 28 artists, six of which directly qualifying from the newcomers' section  (held on 16 December 2022), competed in the festival. This took place over the course of five consecutive nights, articulated as follows:

 On each of the first two nights, half of the entrants performed their songs, and were judged by three separate panels from a jury of journalists.
 On the third night, all of the songs were performed and voted through a 50/50 split system by means of televoting and a demoscopic jury. The results were combined with those of the previous nights.
 On the fourth night, the contestants each performed a cover of a song, and were voted by the same system used on the first three nights.
 On the last night, the 28 entries once again performed, going through the same system used on the first four nights, to be added up to the results obtained that far; ultimately, a final voting round (again a sum of televoting and the two juries) was held among the top 5, which determined the winner.

The first 22 competing artists were announced on 4 December 2022. On 16 December, the six artists qualifying from the  section were announced, alongside the titles of all 28 competing songs. Two former Eurovision Song Contest entrants were among the competing artists: Anna Oxa and Marco Mengoni.

Final 
The 28 Big Artists each performed their entry again for a final time on 11 February 2023. A combination of public televoting, press jury voting and demoscopic jury voting selected the top five to face a superfinal vote, then the winner of Sanremo 2023 was decided by a combination of public televoting (34%), demoscopic jury voting (33%) and press jury voting (33%). Marco Mengoni was declared the winner of the contest with the song "".

At Eurovision 
According to Eurovision rules, all nations with the exceptions of the host country and the "Big Five" (France, Germany, Italy, Spain and the United Kingdom) are required to qualify from one of two semi-finals in order to compete in the final; the top ten countries from each semi-final progress to the final. As a member of the "Big Five", Italy automatically qualified to compete in the final on 13 May 2023. In addition to its participation in the final, Italy was also required to broadcast and vote in one of the two semi-finals. This was decided via a draw held during the semi-final allocation draw on 31 January 2023, when it was announced that Italy would be voting in the first semi-final.

References 

2023
Countries in the Eurovision Song Contest 2023
Eurovision